Moussa Gueye (born 28 February 1985) is a Senegalese footballer who plays as a central defender.

He is the younger brother of Ibrahima Gueye who currently plays for K.S.C. Lokeren in Belgium.

Career
Gueye began his career at Douanes Dakar, before being transferred to the Lebanese Premier League side Nejmeh SC. With the club of Manara he played in the AFC Cup group stage.

On 15 January 2011, Gueye signed a one-a-half-year contract with Bulgarian Montana, joining them on a free transfer.

External links

1985 births
Living people
Senegalese footballers
AS Douanes (Senegal) players
Nejmeh SC players
FC Montana players
Senegalese expatriate footballers
Senegalese expatriate sportspeople in Bulgaria
Expatriate footballers in Bulgaria
Footballers from Dakar
Association football central defenders
Senegalese expatriate sportspeople in Lebanon
Expatriate footballers in Lebanon
Lebanese Premier League players